Priscilla Schwartz is a Sierra Leonean lawyer, the first woman to serve as Attorney General and Minister of Justice (2018–2020) in Sierra Leone.

Early life and education
Schwartz was born Priscilla Fofana. She graduated from Fourah Bay College with a Bachelor of Arts and a Bachelor of Laws. She obtained a Master of Laws from Kings College, University of London and her juris doctor at Queen Mary, University of London.

Career

Politics

On 11 June 2018 Schwartz became the first woman in the history of Sierra Leone to be appointed Attorney General and Minister of Justice. She was handpicked by President Julius Maada Bio to replace Charles Margai.

From 1996 to 2006, she was State Counsel and Special Assistant to the Attorney General and Minister of Justice in Sierra  Leone. She advised on energy, telecommunications as well as petroleum and mineral mining. Schwartz played a key role in organizing the UN Special Court for Sierra  Leone and Security Council visit.

Academia

Schwartz was a law professor at the University of Leicester from 2007–2012. From 2008 until 2011, she was a senior lecturer at her alma mater Queen Mary, University of London. She also lectured at the School of Oriental and African Studies, University of London from 2011 until 2013. Before her appointment as Attorney-General and Minister of Justice, she was a senior lecturer and the Director of the Energy and Natural Resources  Law  Programme, at the College of Professional Services,  Royal  Docks School of Business and Law, University of East London, United  Kingdom from 2012 to 2018.

Schwartz's research is widely published in international business law and economic development journals.

Law

Schwartz is called to the bar in Sierra Leone.  She is a barrister and solicitor at the Sierra Leone Supreme Court. Her specialities are energy law, natural resource law, international investment law, international finance law, international trade law, corporate governance, social responsibility and environmental law. She has advised governments and international companies operating in developing countries.

Selected publications
 Energy  Resources   Financing (2018) 
 Powe ring the Right to Development: Sustainable Energy in a Changing Climate (2016) 
 Capitalism,   International   Investment   Law   and   the Development Conundrum (2014) 
 Public-Private Partnerships and Government Services in the least Developed  Countries  (2013) 
 Trade  and  Development  Partnerships (2010) 
 Sustainable Energy Infrastructure: Law and Policy (2009) 
 Sustainable Development and Mining in Sierra Leone (2006)

References

Alumni of the University of London
Attorneys-general of Sierra Leone
Fourah Bay College alumni
Living people
Sierra Leonean academics
Sierra Leone People's Party politicians
21st-century Sierra Leonean women politicians
21st-century Sierra Leonean politicians
Sierra Leonean women academics
Women government ministers of Sierra Leone
1967 births
Female justice ministers
Academics of the University of Leicester
Academics of Queen Mary University of London